Rambo Nunataks is a loose chain of nunataks which lie northwest of Patuxent Range and extend along the west side of the Foundation Ice Stream for 17 nautical miles (31 km) in the Pensacola Mountains. Mapped by United States Geological Survey (USGS) from surveys and U.S. Navy air photos, 1956–66. Named by Advisory Committee on Antarctic Names (US-ACAN) for William L. Rambo, geophysicist in the Pensacola Mountains, 1965–66.

Features
Geographical features include:

 Blackburn Nunatak
 Kuhn Nunatak
 Möller Ice Stream
 Oliver Nunatak
 Sowle Nunatak
 Wagner Nunatak

Nunataks of Queen Elizabeth Land